Le Bihan, or Bihan (meaning "small" in Breton), is a surname, and may refer to:

 Johann Le Bihan (born 1979), French retired medley swimmer
 Luc Bihan (born 1957) French sculptor, artist, graphic artist and animation director
 Samuel Le Bihan (born 1965), French actor
 Denis Le Bihan (born 1957),  French medical doctor, physicist and neuroscientist

The word is cognate with the Welsh word bychan and the surname Vaughan from which it derives.

Surnames of Breton origin
Breton-language surnames